The Barcaldine Region is a local government area in Central West Queensland, Australia. Established in 2008, it was preceded by three previous local government areas which had existed for over a century.

It has an estimated operating budget of A$21.6 million.

History 
Barcaldine Region includes the traditional tribal lands of the Iningai. Iningai (also known as Yiningay, Muttaburra, Tateburra, Yinangay, Yinangi) is an Australian Aboriginal language spoken by the Iningai people. The Iningai language region includes the landscape within the local government boundaries of the Longreach Region and Barcaldine Region, particularly the towns of Longreach, Barcaldine, Muttaburra and Aramac as well as the properties of Bowen Downs and catchments of Cornish Creek and Alice River.

Kuungkari (also known as Kungkari and Koonkerri) is a language of Western Queensland. The Kuungkari language region includes the landscape within the local government boundaries of Longreach Shire Council and Blackall-Tambo Shire Council.

Jirandali (also known as Yirandali, Warungu, Yirandhali) is an Australian Aboriginal language of North-West Queensland, particularly the Hughenden area. The language region includes the local government area of the Shire of Flinders, including Dutton River, Flinders River, Mount Sturgeon, Caledonia (in the Barcaldine Region), Richmond, Corfield, Winton, Torrens, Tower Hill, Landsborough Creek, Lammermoor Station, Hughenden, and Tangorin.

Prior to the 2008 amalgamation, the Barcaldine Region existed as three distinct local government areas:

 the Shire of Barcaldine;
 the Shire of Aramac;
 and the Shire of Jericho.

When the Divisional Boards Act 1879 was proclaimed on 11 November 1879, what is now the Barcaldine Region was part of the Barcaldine, Aramac, Kargoolnah and Bauhinia divisions. With the passage of the Local Authorities Act 1902, all four became Shires on 31 March 1903. A number of boundary changes took place thereafter, but by the establishment of the Shire of Jericho on 1 January 1916, the boundaries were to remain unchanged for 92 years.

In July 2007, the Local Government Reform Commission released its report and recommended that the three areas amalgamate. All three councils were rated as weak to moderate in terms of financial sustainability, and the three areas were believed to form a collective community of interest with the town of Barcaldine serving as a regional centre with commercial facilities and an airport. All three councils opposed the amalgamation, with Aramac putting an alternate suggestion together with the Shire of Winton. On 15 March 2008, the three Shires formally ceased to exist, and elections were held on the same day to elect councillors and a mayor to the Regional Council.

On 22 November 2019 the Queensland Government decided to amalgamate the localities in the Barcaldine Region, resulting in five expanded localities based on the larger towns:

 Alpha, absorbing Beaufort, Drummondslope, Dunrobin (south-eastern corner), Hobartville (north-eastern part), Pine Hill, Port Wine, Sedgeford, Surbiton
 Aramac, absorbing Cornish Creek (eastern part), Dunrobin (south-western corner), Galilee, Garfield (western corner), Ibis, Ingberry (northern part), Pelican Creek, Sardine (eastern part), Upland, Upper Cornish Creek
 Barcaldine, absorbing Barcaldine Downs, Evora, Grant (bulk), Home Creek, Ingberry (southern part), Moombria, Narbethong (bulk), Patrick, Saltern Creek, Tara Station
 Jericho, absorbing Dunrobin (bulk), Garfield (bulk), Grant (eastern corner), Hobartville (south-western part), Mexico, Narbethong (north-east corner)
 Muttaburra, absorbing Bangall, Cornish Creek (western part), Sardine (western part), Tablederry

Wards
The council is undivided, with six councillors and a mayor serving the whole region.

Towns and localities 
The Barcaldine Region includes the following settlements:

Barcaldine area:
 Barcaldine
 Alice
 Barcaldine Downs
 Evora
 Grant
 Home Creek
 Moombria
 Narbethong
 Patrick
 Saltern Creek
 Tara Station

Aramac area:
 Aramac
 Bangall
 Cornish Creek
 Galilee
 Ibis
 Ingberry
 Muttaburra
 Pelican Creek
 Sardine
 Tablederry
 Upland
 Upper Cornish Creek

Jericho area:
 Alpha
 Jericho
 Beaufort
 Drummondslope
 Dunrobin
 Garfield
 Hobartville
 Mexico
 Pine Hill
 Port Wine
 Sedgeford
 Surbiton

Mayors
2008–2020 : Rob Chandler

2020–present: Sean Micheal Dillion

Population
The populations given relate to the component entities prior to 2008. The  was the first for the new Region.

Services 
In cooperation with Rural Libraries Queensland, Barcaldine Regional Council operate libraries in Alpha, Aaramac, Barcaldine (headquarters), Jericho, and Muttaburra.

References

External links
 

 
Local government areas of Queensland
2008 establishments in Australia